Pritam Singh (born 2 August 1976) is a Singaporean politician, lawyer and author who has been serving as Leader of the Opposition since 2020 and Secretary-General of the Workers' Party since 2018. Singh has been the Member of Parliament (MP) representing the Eunos division of Aljunied GRC since 2011. 

Singh graduated from the National University of Singapore in 2000 with a Bachelor of Arts degree in history. In 1999, he won the Straits Steamship Prize for being the top undergraduate student in history and political science. He was later awarded the Chevening Scholarship for postgraduate studies at King's College London, where he completed a Master of Arts degree in war studies in 2004. 

Singh joined the Workers' Party and was elected to Parliament in the 2011 general election, and has retained his parliamentary seat in subsequent elections. That same year, Singh completed a Juris Doctor degree at the Singapore Management University as well as qualifying for the bar. In 2013, Singh joined the litigation and dispute resolution practice at Donaldson & Burkinshaw, Singapore's oldest law firm. 

Singh was elected Secretary-General of the Workers' Party on 8 April 2018 as part of a leadership renewal, succeeding Low Thia Khiang. After the 2020 general election, his party emerged as the largest opposition party in Parliament, and he was appointed Leader of the Opposition by Prime Minister Lee Hsien Loong.

Early life and education
Singh was born on 2 August 1976 in Singapore. He attended Woodsville Primary School, Belvedere Primary School, Saint Thomas Secondary School — under the Normal (Academic) stream, and Jurong Junior College. He graduated from the National University of Singapore with a Bachelor of Arts degree in history in 2000 under the Singapore Armed Forces's Local Study Award scholarship.

He also graduated from King's College London in 2004 with a Master of Arts degree in war studies under the Chevening Scholarship.

Singh also completed a diploma in Islamic studies from the International Islamic University Malaysia in 2005. In 2007, Singh founded Opinion Asia, an online commentary syndicate with a focus on issues related to Asia and Asians. He obtained a Juris Doctor degree from the Singapore Management University in 2011.

Career

Military career
Singh enlisted in the Singapore Armed Forces in 1994 and served as a commissioned officer between 1996 and 2002. During his service, he was a combat engineer. At present, he is a reservist commander with the rank of Major.

Legal career
In 2013, Singh joined the litigation and dispute resolution practice at Donaldson & Burkinshaw, Singapore's oldest law firm.

Political career

Singh joined the Workers' Party while completing a juris doctor degree at the Singapore Management University, citing its "level-headedness and leadership" as his primary motivator.

During the 2011 general election, Singh was part of the five-member Workers' Party team which contested in Aljunied GRC. The team included the party's secretary-general Low Thia Khiang, chairwoman Sylvia Lim and members Chen Show Mao and Muhamad Faisal bin Abdul Manap. They faced the team from the incumbent People's Action Party (PAP), which was led by Foreign Affairs minister George Yeo. The Workers' Party's team defeated the PAP team by 72,289 votes (54.7%) to 59,829 (45.2%), marking the first occasion in Singapore's history in which an opposition party had won an election in a GRC.

Since the election, Singh has represented the Eunos ward within the constituency in Parliament. Singh was appointed as the assistant secretary general on the party's executive council. Singh was also previously the chairman of the Aljunied–Hougang Town Council (AHTC) from 2016 to 2020.

Leadership of the Workers' Party
In 2017, after Low Thia Khiang announced that he was contemplating retirement as well as wanting to rejuvenate the party for "younger blood", Singh was widely regarded to be the next chief of the Workers' Party prior to the general election that would have been scheduled to be held by 2021. Subsequently, Singh was eventually confirmed as secretary-general of the Workers' Party on 8 April 2018 after Low stepped down for a leadership self-renewal.

2020 general election
The results of the 2020 general election saw Singh, together with Sylvia Lim, Muhamad Faisal Manap and former NCMPs Gerald Giam and Leon Perera, being re-elected to represent the Aljunied GRC constituents, with an increased share of the vote of 59.95%, defeating the PAP team that received 40.05%. The Workers' Party had also won Hougang SMC, its stronghold which has been held since 1991, and the newly created Sengkang GRC, the first time the Workers' Party had won a general election in a second GRC.

Singh is a member of the Estate and Liaison Committee and the Tenders and Contracts Committee. He is the Town Councillor of the Public Relations Committee in the Aljunied–Hougang Town Council (AHTC).

Leader of the Opposition
Following the 2020 general election in which the Workers' Party won ten seats, Prime Minister Lee Hsien Loong decided to formally designate Singh as Leader of the Opposition, and said that he would be "provided with appropriate staff support and resources" to carry out his new parliamentary appointment role. Prior to this, the leader of the opposition was an unofficial de facto position in Parliament as the Constitution and standing orders of Parliament did not provide for such a position. With the creation of the formal office, Parliament announced that the appointment holder will draw an annual salary of S$385,000, double the salary of a regular Member of Parliament. Singh made the decision to donate half of the allowance increase from his new appointment for his party, charitable causes as well as his residents' needs.

Political positions
In 2020, Singh recommended a universal monthly minimum wage of S$1,300 in place of progressive wage. In 2023, Singh advocated for a mandatory knowledge of the English language when accessing aspirants of citizenship or permanent residency in Singapore.

Personal life
Singh is a practicing Sikh. He is married to Loveleen Kaur Walia, a Singaporean theatre practitioner, and the couple have two daughters.

References

External links

Pritam Singh on Parliament of Singapore
Workers' Party of Singapore profile

|-

|-

1976 births
Living people
National University of Singapore alumni
Singaporean people of Indian descent
Alumni of King's College London
Singapore Management University alumni
Members of the Parliament of Singapore
Workers' Party (Singapore) politicians
Singaporean people of Punjabi descent
21st-century Singaporean lawyers
Singaporean Sikhs
Chevening Scholars